Starksia guadalupae, the Guadalupe blenny, is a species of labrisomid blenny native to the Pacific coast of Mexico where it is found at depths of from .

References

guadalupae
Fish described in 1971
Taxa named by Richard Heinrich Rosenblatt